Sarah West may refer to:

Sarah West (born 1972), Royal Navy officer, the first woman to be appointed to command a major warship in the Royal Navy
Sarah West (actress) (1790–1876), British actress
Sarah West (Prisoner character), character from the Australian TV series Prisoner portrayed by Kylie Belling

See also
Sara West, Australian actress
Sarah, West Virginia, an unincorporated community in Cabell County, West Virginia